"Femme Fatale" is a song by American rock band the Velvet Underground from their 1967 debut album The Velvet Underground & Nico, with lead vocals by Nico.

Background
The song was composed in the key of C major. At the request of Andy Warhol, band frontman Lou Reed wrote the song about Warhol superstar Edie Sedgwick.  According to Reed, Warhol said when asked what he should write about her: "Oh, don't you think she's a femme fatale, Lou?", with consequence, Reed wrote "Femme Fatale". 

The song was recorded with vocals by Nico.  Guitarist Sterling Morrison said of the title:

"Femme Fatale" was recorded at the Scepter Studios in New York in April 1966 while the studio was still under construction. It was released as a B-Side to "Sunday Morning" in December 1966. The following year it was included in their debut album The Velvet Underground & Nico. A 1969 live recording of the song was included in Bootleg Series Volume 1: The Quine Tapes released in 2001.

Critical reception
AllMusic critic Mark Deming thought that "Femme Fatale" was among the four best songs on the album. American music journalist Stephen Davis called "Femme Fatale" a beautiful song that portrays the vivid, conflicted and emotional undercurrents of 1966.

Personnel
 Nicolead vocals
 Lou Reedlead guitar, backing vocals
 John Calepiano, bass
 Sterling Morrisonlead guitar, backing vocals
 Maureen Tuckersnare drum, tambourine

References

 

 
1966 singles
1966 songs
The Velvet Underground songs
Nico songs
Songs written by Lou Reed
Verve Records singles